Aurora Morata (born 26 February 1961) is a Spanish gymnast. She competed in five events at the 1980 Summer Olympics.

References

1961 births
Living people
Spanish female artistic gymnasts
Olympic gymnasts of Spain
Gymnasts at the 1980 Summer Olympics
People from Vilanova i la Geltrú
Sportspeople from the Province of Barcelona